The cloud forest salamander from Cofre de Perote (Chiropterotriton nubilus) is a species of salamander in the family Plethodontidae. It is endemic to Cofre de Perote in central Veracruz, Mexico, where it is known from arboreal bromeliads in cloud forests with low to moderate disturbance.

References 

Chiropterotriton
Endemic amphibians of Mexico
Amphibians described in 2018